The posterior atlantooccipital membrane (posterior atlantooccipital ligament) is a broad, thin membrane. It is connected above to the posterior margin of the foramen magnum, and below to the upper border of the posterior arch of the atlas.

Anatomy 
At either lateral extremity of the membrane above the groove for the vertebral artery the membrane forms a gap for the passage of the vertebral artery, and the spinal nerve C1.

The free border of the membrane arches over the artery and nerve, and is sometimes ossified.

Innervation 
The membrane is innervated by the spinal nerve C1.

Relations 
The membrane is deep to the recti capitis posteriores minores, and obliqui capitis superiores. It is superficial to the dura mater of the vertebral canal to which it is closely associated.

Research 
In 2015, Scali et al. revisited the anatomy of the posterior atlantooccipital membrane via plastination. Their findings revealed that the PAO membrane superiorly consisted of periosteum of the occiput, whereas inferiorly it formed part of the dura at the cerebrospinal junction, terminating at the level of the third cervical vertebra (rather than attaching to the posterior arch of the atlas). It is believed that this anatomical arrangement permits a superiorly located anchor point for epidural bridging structures and allows dural tensile forces to act in a summated synchronized manner. The author's hypothesize that this complex area assists with outflow of cerebrospinal fluid.

See also 

 Anterior atlantooccipital membrane

Additional images

References 

Human head and neck